The Microweiseinae are a subfamily of Coccinellidae, the lady beetles. Members of the Microweiseinae subfamily are often found to have their head curved down, closely held against their ventral side. In comparison to common garden coccinellids, ladybugs, the Microweiseinae lack the important bright markings that serve as warnings to potential predators.

References
 Escalona, H. E. and Ślipinski, A. (2012), Generic revision and phylogeny of Microweiseinae (Coleoptera: Coccinellidae). Systematic Entomology, 37: 125–171.

External links

Coccinellidae
Beetle subfamilies